The 2013 Mediterranean Games, officially known as the XVII Mediterranean Games and commonly known as Mersin 2013, was an international multi-sport event held from 20 to 30 June 2013 in Mersin, Turkey. Mersin was announced as the host city at the General Assembly of the International Committee of Mediterranean Games (CIJM) on 23 February 2011. Mersin is the second city in Turkey after İzmir to host the Mediterranean Games. All 24 member National Olympic Committees (NOCs) of the ICMG participated in the Games. The official programme for the Games is featuring events in 27 different sports.

Background 
The Mediterranean Games is a multi-sport event, much like the Summer Olympics (albeit on a much smaller scale), with participation exclusively from countries around the Mediterranean Sea where Europe, Africa and Asia meet. The Games started in 1951 and are held every four years. The idea of holding the Mediterranean Games originated with Muhammed Taher Pasha, who was the chairman of the Egyptian Olympic Committee and the vice-president of the International Olympic Committee (IOC), at a meeting during the 1948 London Olympics. The Games "were designed specifically to bring together the Muslim and European countries surrounding the Mediterranean basin" to promote understanding through sporting competition.

The first edition of the Mediterranean Games was held in the Egyptian city of Alexandria in 1951 and attracted 734 competitors from 10 nations. Initially the female athletes were not allowed to compete. Beginning by the fifth (1976) game in Tunis female athletes were also allowed. Turkey hosted the Games for the first time in 1971 in Izmir—the sixth edition of the Games.

Bidding process

Host city selection 
Cities from three countries submitted their bids to host the 2013 Mediterranean Games. Two Greek cities, Volos and Larisa, made a combined bid. This was the fourth attempt by the Croatian city of Rijeka to host the Mediterranean Games. Rijeka had lost its bids in 1995 for the 1997 games, in 1999 for the 2001 games and in 2003 for the 2009 Mediterranean Games. The voting for the selection of the host of the 2013 Games was held in Pescara, Italy, host of the 2009 Mediterranean Games, on 27 October 2007. The election was conducted by the Mediterranean Games Bid Committee. At the end of the first round of voting, only Volos-Larisa and Rijeka remained; Mersin was eliminated after having received only thirteen votes. In the first round, Volos-Larisa and Rijeka received 31 and 24 votes, respectively. In the second round, the Greek bid of Volos-Larisa received enough votes to be elected as the host. The final round was comparatively more competitive, which was demonstrated by a three-vote difference between the final two bids.

Greece was stripped of the hosting rights on 28 January 2011 because of its financial crisis. The ICMG cited Greece's inability to conform the organisational requirements as a reason for this action. Culture and Tourism Minister of Greece Pavlos Geroulanos said that the initially proposed budget "would have wasted money on a big, spendthrift party, [and that] [t]here are much better things [they] could spend that money on in the current situation". ICMG conducted an on-line poll on 23 February to decide the new host. Three cities—Tarragona, Tripoli and Mersin—offered to host the 2013 Mediterranean Games. Citizens of the 21 member nations of the ICMG cast their votes to select the host. Mersin was selected after it received more than half of the total votes, and on 4 March, ICMG president Amar Addad officially handed over the hosting rights of the 2013 Games to Mersin.

Development and preparation

Organisation 
The organising committee of the 2013 Mediterranean Games consisted of eight members: president of the committee is Minister of Youth and Sports Suat Kılıç, Hakan Hakyemez, Governor of Mersin Hasan Basri Güzeloğlu, Mehmet Baykan, Mersin Metropolitan Municipality Mayor Macit Özcan, rector of the Mersin University K. Aydin Süha, Hasan Albayrak and president of the Turkish Olympic Committee Uğur Erdener. It was in charge of "organising and controlling the essential preparations".

Costs 
After the success of the bid in February 2011, the Ministry of Youth and Sports spent  215 million on building the venues and infrastructure up to 31 December 2012. The Ministry has allocated a budget of  400 million to cover building the venues and infrastructure for the Games; at least  100 million was spent on the development of the Games village and the main stadium, and  200 million was assigned for other venues.

Logo and mascot 

The official logo of this edition of the Mediterranean Games featured a loggerhead sea turtle (Caretta caretta) getting out of sea, with water underneath it. An orange is shown above its back, which represents the dry summer subtropical climate of Mediterranean.

Karetta was the official mascot of the Mersin Games. The organisers of the 2013 Games have taken steps to promote the Games through its mascot. It was used in various events like the 34th Istanbul Marathon, Third Citrus Festival and others.

Venues 
The main stadium of the 2013 Mediterranean Games is Mersin Olympic Stadium in Yenişehir district of Mersin. The stadium hosted both the opening and closing ceremonies. A total of 38 venues were used to host the events during the Games, 13 of them for training purposes only. The events took place in several venues at different districts of Mersin and neighboring city of Adana.

The Games

Sports 
There were significant changes in the programme for the Mersin Games in comparison to that of the 2009 Mediterranean Games held in Pescara. Three new sports, archery, badminton and taekwondo, were the special additions. The programme for the Games featured a total of 27 different sports. Two disabled sports—athletics and swimming—were contested by the athletes with physical disabilities. Even though it was planned, equestrian competitions were not held.

Participating nations 
All 24 member countries of the ICMG participated in the Games. This was the highest number of nations in any edition of the Mediterranean Games. Macedonia (FYROM) made its debut in the Games.

 
 
 
 
 
 
 
 
 
 
 
 
  (debuting country)
 
 
 
 
 
 
 
 
 
 
  (host country)

Medal table

See also

Gallery

References 

 
Mediterranean Games
Mediterranean Games
International sports competitions hosted by Turkey
June 2013 sports events
June 2013 sports events in Turkey
2013
Greek government-debt crisis
Recep Tayyip Erdoğan controversies